La sombra del pasado (English title: Shadows of the Past), is a Mexican telenovela, produced by MaPat López de Zatarain for Televisa. It is a remake of the telenovela written by José Cuauhtémoc Blanco and Víctor Manuel Medina Cervantes El manantial in 2001.

Michelle Renaud and Pablo Lyle stars as the protagonists, while Alexis Ayala and Alejandra Barros stars as the antagonists. There is a special participation of Susana González and René Strickler, with Alfredo Adame, Manuel "Flaco" Ibáñez and first actress Cynthia Klitbo.

Production of La sombra del pasado officially started on August 18, 2014.

Plot 
Two very different families live in the village of Santa Lucía who are involved in a whirlwind of passion, pain, and revenge. The rivaling families are the Mendozas and the Alcocers.

Severiano Mendoza and Candela Santana are a rich and powerful marriage who live at the ranch, "Las Ánimas", along with their young son, Cristóbal. Roberta and Raymundo Alcocer also have a daughter named Aldonza; however, they do not live with the same luxuries as the Mendoza family, which causes frustration and resentment in Roberta as nothing is enough to fill the inferiority complex that follows her like a shadow.

Cast

Main

Recurring

Mexico broadcast 
On November 10, 2014, Canal de las Estrellas broadcast of La sombra del pasado weeknights at 7:15pm, replacing La malquerida. The last episode was broadcast on May 17, 2015, with La vecina replacing it on May 25, 2015, weekdays at 6:10pm.

Awards and nominations

References

External links 

Mexican telenovelas
2014 telenovelas
2014 Mexican television series debuts
Televisa telenovelas
2010s Mexican television series
2015 Mexican television series endings
Spanish-language telenovelas